Josef Penninger (born 5 September 1964) is an Austrian biomedical researcher specialising in molecular immunology. He was the scientific director of the Institute of Molecular Biotechnology located at the Vienna Biocenter until 2018. In February 2018, he announced his decision to leave Vienna and become the head of the Life Sciences Institute of the University of British Columbia in Vancouver, British Columbia, Canada.

The asteroid 48801 Penninger is named in his honour.

References

External links 

 

Living people
Austrian geneticists
University of Innsbruck alumni
1964 births